The Australian Payments Council is the strategic coordination body for the payments industry.  It promotes industry collaboration and engages directly with the Reserve Bank of Australia’s Payments System Board (PSB).

The Payments Council also encourages and facilitates strategic alignment between the payments industry and the Payments System Board on significant payments issues and initiatives.

The Council membership comprises senior executives drawn from a broad community of payments organisations including financial institutions, card schemes, major retailers and other payment service providers as well as the Australian Payments Clearing Association (APCA) and the Reserve Bank of Australia (RBA).  Robert Milliner acts as the independent non-executive chairman of the Council.

Objectives
The Australian Payments Council works collaboratively with the industry to ensure the  Australian payments system continues to  meet the changing needs of Australian businesses and consumers.   The Australian Payments Council’s achieves this by:

 Driving the strategic agenda for the Australian payments system
 Engaging with the Payments System Board on setting and achieving strategic objectives
 Identifying strategic issues and emerging trends 
 Generating common industry positions for  adoption by the industry
 Identifying and removing any barriers to innovation through collaboration

History
In October 2013, the Australian Payments Clearing Association (APCA) and the Reserve Bank of Australia (RBA) launched a joint consultation on establishing a new payments industry coordination body. Over 15 industry submissions were received in November 2013 to help shape the structure and governance of the council.

The Australian Payments Council was established in August 2014. The initial member organisations drawn from the wider Payments Community to form the Payments Council were: ANZ, APCA, Commonwealth Bank, Cuscal, eftpos Payments, First Data, National Australia Bank, PayPal, RBA, Suncorp-Metway, Visa, Westpac and Woolworths.

The Australian Payments Council met for the final time on 28 February 2022. The decision to discontinue its role as the strategic coordination body for the Australian payments recognised that arrangements announced by the Government in response to the Review of the Australian Payments System will largely supersede the role of the APC.

References

External links 
 Australian Payments Council Website

Banking in Australia